Whitelock Creek is a tributary of the Susquehanna River in Wyoming County and Luzerne County, in Pennsylvania, in the United States. It has one named tributary, which is known as Mill Creek. The surficial geology in the vicinity of Whitelock Creek mainly consists of alluvium, Wisconsinan Ice-Contact Stratified Drift, Wisconsinan Till, bedrock, and alluvial terrace.

Major land uses in the watershed of Whitelock Creek include forested land and agricultural land. A number of bridges have been constructed over the creek. Its watershed is designated as a Coldwater Fishery and a Migratory Fishery. Trout have been observed in Whitelock Creek, as have numerous macroinvertebrate taxa.

Course

Whitelock Creek begins on a hill in Northmoreland Township, Wyoming County. It flows south-southeast for several tenths of a mile before turning east and then southeast. After a few tenths of a mile, the creek enters Franklin Township, Luzerne County and flows into Perrins Marsh. In Perrins Marsh, it reenters Northmoreland Township, Wyoming County and flows north-northeast for a few tenths of amile. It then turns east-northeast for a few miles, flowing along a valley that gradually narrows. The creek enters Exeter Township, Wyoming County and briefly passes into Exeter Township, Luzerne County before reentering Exeter Township, Wyoming County. It then turns north-northeast for a few miles before turning east and receiving Mill Creek, its only named tributary, from the left. The creek continues flowing east along the border of the census-designated place of West Falls before crossing Pennsylvania Route 92 and reaching its confluence with the Susquehanna River.

Whitelock Creek joins the Susquehanna River  upriver of its mouth.

Tributaries
Whitelock Creek has one named tributary, which is known as Mill Creek.

Geography and geology

The surficial geology along the lower reaches of Whitelock Creek mainly consists of alluvium. The sides of its valley have surficial geology featuring Wisconsinan Ice-Contact Stratified Drift, Wisconsinan Till, and bedrock consisting of coal, conglomeratic sandstone, sandstone, and shale. There is also a patch of alluvial terrace near the creek's mouth. The surficial geology further upstream is fairly similar except that there is little Wisconsinan Ice-Contact Stratified Drift or alluvium at the headwaters and that the bedrock consists only of sandstone and shale.

There are at least  of pipeline in the watershed of Whitelock Creek. This pipeline crosses a number of streams.

Watershed
The mouth of the stream is in the United States Geological Survey quadrangle of Ransom. However, its source is in the quadrangle of Center Moreland.

A dam known as Perrins Marsh Dam is situated on Whitelock Creek. The dam is classified as a "significant hazard" dam, as of 1981. At this point in time, a dam failure could have caused damage to properties and bridges further downstream, as well as possibly killing several people.

The main land use in the watershed of Whitelock Creek is forested land. However, agricultural land is also present in significant amounts. Further downstream, it flowed through a largely uninhabited valley.

History
Whitelock Creek was entered into the Geographic Names Information System on August 2, 1979. Its identifier in the Geographic Names Information System is 1199788.

A third bridge of the same type was built over the creek in 1945 and was repaired in 1996. In 2007, a concrete box beam or girders bridge carrying Pennsylvania Route 92 over the creek was built.

A cleanup of flood debris and gravel on Whitelock Creek was planned in 2006. In 2012, several members of the National Civilian Community Corps cleaned up debris along Whitelock Creek. One bridge over the creek is considered to be structurally deficient.

Biology
The drainage basin of Whitelock Creek is designated as a Coldwater Fishery and a Migratory Fishery. Wild trout naturally reproduce in the creek and its tributary Mill Creek from their upper reaches downstream to their mouths.

Numerous macroinvertebrate taxa have been observed in Whitelock Creek. At one site in the summer of 2012, 162 individuals from 17 taxa were observed at the creek. These included four beetle genera, three dragonfly genera, two caddisfly genera, two mayfly genera, and two stonefly genera. The clam genus Sphaerium, the crayfish genus Orconectes, the hellgrammite genus Corydalus, and the midge family Chironomidae were also observed. The EPT (Ephemeroptera, Plecoptera, and Trichoptera) taxa richness value was 6 and the Becks Index Version 3 value was 8. The Hilsenhoff Biotic Index value was 3.994 and the Shannon Diversity Index value was 1.924.

At another site on Whitelock Creek, 148 individuals from 11 macroinvertebrate taxa were observed in the summer of 2012. These included two caddisfly genera, two dragonfly genera, and two mayfly genera. They also included the beetle genus Optioservus, the cranefly genus Leptotarsus, the hellgrammite genus Corydalus, and the midge family Chironomidae.

See also
Keeler Creek, next tributary of the Susquehanna River going downriver
Buttermilk Creek (Susquehanna River), next tributary of the Susquehanna River going upriver
List of rivers of Pennsylvania

References

Rivers of Wyoming County, Pennsylvania
Rivers of Luzerne County, Pennsylvania
Tributaries of the Susquehanna River
Rivers of Pennsylvania